The Gaziantep Mevlevi Culture and Foundation Works Museums is a museum in Gaziantep, Gaziantep Province, Turkey.

History
The museum was originally constructed as the Antep Mevlevi Lodge in 1638. Throughout the years, the building had been used as school, storage, office etc. In 2006, it was renovated to be a museum by the Gaziantep Regional Directorate of Foundations. The museum was finally opened on 7 May 2007 as the Gaziantep Mevlevi Culture and Foundation Works Museums.

Architecture
The museum complex consists of two buildings. The main building consists of three stories. The other building located at the northern part of the complex has two stories.

Exhibitions
The museum exhibits various works from Mevlevi Order culture. It also features various hand written Quran and calligraphy.

See also
 Museums in Turkey

References

2007 establishments in Turkey
Buildings and structures completed in 1638
Museums in Gaziantep